Leptothele bencha is a species of spiders in the family Euagridae first described by Robert Raven & Peter J. Schwendinger in 1995, and is native to the Malay Peninsula.

References

Euagridae
Spiders described in 1995